Mount Trimble is an unincorporated community in Morgan County in the U.S. state of West Virginia's Eastern Panhandle. Mount Trimble is situated  around the crossroads at Michael's Chapel near the confluence of Sleepy Creek and Meadow Branch.

Historic sites 
Michael's Chapel

References

Unincorporated communities in Morgan County, West Virginia
Unincorporated communities in West Virginia